Dancing Stars is the Bulgarian adaptation of the BBC Worldwide format Dancing With The Stars. The first season of the show started on 22 September 2008 and was aired on bTV. The first season of the show was hosted by Radost Draganova and Todor Kolev. It aired from Monday to Thursday with two live shows, on Monday (main show) and Thursday (results show) and two background episodes on Tuesday and Wednesday. Dancing stars 1 was produced by Old School Productions and proved to be a huge success reaching an average audience share of over 40%, beating Nova Television's Big Brother 4.

It is also called Dancing Stars on Austrian television and draws a comparable audience.

Season 1

Judges

 Vladimir Bozhilov
 Galena Velikova
 Neshka Robeva

Contestants

 Orlin Pavlov - Pop singer           Winner
 Violeta Markovska - Actress    Runner up
 Neti - Actress and singer             3rd place
 Ilyana Raeva - Ex-gymnast          4th place
 Anya Pencheva - Actress
 Niki Kunchev - TV host
 Alisia - Pop-folk singer
 Galena - Pop-folk singer
 Bojidar Iskrenov - Former football player
 Kalki - Singer
 Andrey Batashov - Actor
 Georgi Mamalev - Actor
 Georgi Kostadinov - Winner of Survivor BG 2
 Elena Yoncheva - Journalist

Season 2

Judges

 Ilyana Raeva
 Pambous Agapiu
 Vera Marinova
 Maria Gigova

Contestants

 Bianka Panova - World Gymnastics Champion           Winner
 Krasi Ryadkov - Actor    Runner up
 Georgi Milchev-Godji - Musician             3rd place
 Etien Levi - Music teacher
 Madlen Algafari - Psychologist
 Aksiniya - Singer & Reality TV Star
 Stanislava Gancheva - TV Host
 Grafa - Singer
 Veneta Harizanova - Fashion model
 Todor Kirkov - Sport Journalist & TV Anchor
 Krum Savov - Sport Journalist & TV Host
 Kristina Dimitrova - Singer
 Miodrag Ivanov - Showman

Season 3

Judges

 Alfredo Tores
 Kalin Sarmenov
 Galena Velikova
 Ilyana Raeva

Contestants

 Angel Kovachev - Hip-hop Singer           Winner
 Stela Angelova - Stunt man & Former competitor in rhythmic gymnastics    Runner up
 Elena Koleva - Actress             3rd place
 Deo - Singer & TV Host
 Petko Dimitrov - Businessman
 Gloria - Pop-folk Singer
 Rumen Lukanov -  TV Host
 Lyusi Ilarionov - Director & Singer
 Latinka Petrova - Actress
 Ico Hazarta - Rap Singer
 Andrea - Pop-folk Singer
 Detelin Dalakliev - Boxer
 Kapka Georgieva - Politician
 Natalya Kobilkina - Sexologist
 Zeyneb Madjurova - Co-host

Season 4

Judges

 Alfredo Tores
 Hristo Mutavchiev
 Galena Velikova
 Ilyana Raeva

Contestants
 Albena Denkova - competitor in figure skating           Winner
 Mihaela Fileva - Pop singer    Runner up
 Darin Angelov - Actor             3rd place
 Neli Atanasova - TV Host & former rhythmic gymnastics
 Anton Kasabov - Actor & martial arts
 Elena Georgieva - Decorator & participant in Big Brother 2
 Nana Gladuish - TV Host
 Aleksandra Zhekova - Snowboarder
 Venzy - Rap singer
 Albena Mihova - Actress
 Uti Bachvarov - TV Host
 Mihaela (Mika) Stoichkova - Sport journalist & fashion designer. Daughter of Hristo Stoichkov.
 Marian Kyurpanov - Model & actor
 Milko Kalaydjiev - Pop-folk singer
 Encho Danailov - Actor & TV Host

See also
 Dancing with the Stars

References

External links
 Official Site

Bulgaria
Bulgarian reality television series
Bulgarian music television series
2008 Bulgarian television series debuts
2008 Bulgarian television series endings
2013 Bulgarian television series endings
2014 Bulgarian television series endings
Bulgarian television series based on British television series
Bulgarian-language television shows
BTV (Bulgaria) original programming